Seeing Other People may refer to:

Seeing Other People (album), a 2019 album by Foxygen
Seeing Other People (film), a 2004 film 
"Seeing Other People" (song), a 2020 song by MacKenzie Porter
"Seeing Other People", a song by Belle and Sebastian from their 1996 album If You're Feeling Sinister